Abaka may refer to:
 Abaqa Khan (1234–1282), ruler of the Mongol Ilkhanate, based in Persia
 Abacá, a Philippine species of banana
 Abaka (weekly), an Armenian newspaper published in Montreal, Quebec, Canada 
 Abaka is a London-based fintech company that provides organizations with AI-based software.